KBOV (1230 AM) is a radio station broadcasting a classic hits format to the Bishop, California, United States area. The station is currently owned by Great Country Broadcasting, Inc. and features programming from ABC Radio.

The station signed on in 1953 as KIBS. It was the only radio station in Bishop until it launched KIBS-FM in 1967. The FM failed and went silent in 1969. It was resurrected under the ownership of former KIBS DJ Roy Mayhugh in 1978 as KIOQ.

References

External links

Classic hits radio stations in the United States
BOV
Inyo County, California
Radio stations established in 1953
1953 establishments in California